Se-young, also spelled Sei-young, Se-yeong or Se-yong,  is a Korean unisex given name. Its meaning depends on the hanja used to write each syllable of the name. There are 15 hanja with the reading "se" and 34 hanja with the reading "young" on the South Korean government's official list of hanja which may be used in given names.

People with this name include:
Pak Se-yong (1902–1989), North Korean male poet who wrote the lyrics of the country's national anthem
Lloyd Lee (Korean name Lee Seyoung, born 1976), American male NFL football coach of Korean descent
Kim Se-young (born 1981), South Korean female volleyball player
Park Se-young (born 1988), South Korean actress
Lee Se-young (comedian) (born 1989), South Korean female comedian
Park Se-young (footballer) (born 1989), South Korean male football player
Lee Se-young (born 1992), South Korean actress
Kim Sei-young (born 1993), South Korean female golfer
Park Se-yeong (born 1993), South Korean male short track speed skater

See also
List of Korean given names

References

Korean unisex given names